Dávid Bondra (born 26 August 1992) is an American-born Slovak former professional ice hockey player.

Personal life
Bondra was born in Annapolis, Maryland, when his father, Peter was a member of the Washington Capitals. He spent the majority of his youth in the United States where his father played for the Capitals from 1990-2004, and also in Ottawa, Atlanta, and Chicago later in his NHL career.

Playing career

College 
Dávid was a forward at Michigan State University for the Spartans men's ice hockey team. He scored 1 goal over his Michigan State tenure, and was able to tack up 48 healthy scratches. His brother, Nick, was beginning his collegiate career at Amherst College in 2017.

Professional 
Bondra was selected 21st overall in the 2010 KHL draft. Bondra made his professional debut playing for HK Poprad of the Slovak Tipsport Liga.

International play
Bondra also played for Slovakia in the 2018 Men's World Ice Hockey Championships. He was not selected to play for the Slovakian Olympic team, which won the bronze medal in the 2022 Winter Olympics.

Career statistics

Regular season and playoffs

International

References

External links

 

1992 births
Living people
Chicago Steel players
Chilliwack Chiefs players
Michigan State Spartans men's ice hockey players
Sportspeople from Annapolis, Maryland
Slovak ice hockey right wingers
HC Kunlun Red Star players
HK Poprad players
HC Kometa Brno players
Bratislava Capitals players
American ice hockey right wingers
Slovak expatriate sportspeople in China
Slovak expatriate ice hockey players in the Czech Republic
American expatriate ice hockey players in the Czech Republic
American expatriate ice hockey players in China
Slovak people of Polish descent
Slovak people of Rusyn descent
American people of Slovak descent
American people of Polish descent
American people of Rusyn descent
Slovak expatriate ice hockey players in Canada
American expatriate ice hockey players in Canada